Büsra Develi (born 25 August 1993) is a Turkish actress and model. She is known for her lead role in the movie Arada alongside her ex-boyfriend Burak Deniz.

Life and career 
After completing her primary education, she moved to Antalya with her family and completed her secondary and high school education there. Later, she moved to Istanbul to study theater and acting, and by successfully passing the university entrance exams, she enrolled in the Theater department of Mimar Sinan University. She had a role in a music video for Enbe Orkestrası & İlyas Yalçıntaş's song. In 2015, she portrayed the character of Selin in the series Tatlı Küçük Yalancılar and played the role of Rüzgar in Tatlı İntikam. In addition to her career in television, Develi was cast in a leading role in the movie Arada, directed by Mu Tunç. She later had a leading role in the web series Fi.

Personal life 
She was in relationship with a famous actor Burak Deniz from 2015 to 2018.

The breakup was due to irreconcilable differences between Büşra Develi and Burak Deniz.

Filmography

Film

Web series

Television

References

External links 
 
 

Living people
1993 births
Turkish female models
Turkish television actresses
Turkish film actresses